Bruno Georges Pollet (born in 1969 in Orléans, France), educated in Grenoble (Université Joseph Fourier, France), Aberdeen (The University of Aberdeen, Scotland) and Coventry (Coventry University, England), is a French chemist and electrochemist, a Fellow of the UK Royal Society of Chemistry, professor of chemistry, director of the Green Hydrogen Lab, director of the Institute for Hydrogen Research (Institut de Recherche sur l'Hydrogène) at the Université du Québec à Trois-Rivières in Canada and adjunct professor in Renewable Energy at the Norwegian University of Science and Technology (NTNU). He has worked on Hydrogen Energy in the UK, Japan, South Africa, Norway and Canada. He is regarded as one of the most prominent Hydrogen experts in the world. He is a member of the Council of Engineers for the Energy Transition (CEET): An Independent Advisory Council to the United Nations’ Secretary-General. He is President of the Green Hydrogen Division of the International Association for Hydrogen Energy, member of the Board of Directors of the International Association for Hydrogen Energy, member of the Board of Directors of the Canadian Hydrogen and Fuel Cell Association (CHFCA) and member of the Board of Directors of Hydrogène Québec. He was awarded two prestigious NSERC Tier 1 Canada Research Chair in Green Hydrogen Production, and the Innergex Renewable Energy Research Chair (partly funded by the Québec ministère de l'Économie, de l'Innovation et de l'Énergie) focussing on the next generation of hydrogen production and water electrolyzers (electrolysis of water). He was also awarded the "IAHE Sir William Grove Award" for his work in hydrogen, fuel cell and electrolyser technologies by the International Association for Hydrogen Energy (IAHE). His research field covers a wide range of areas within electrochemistry, electrochemical energy conversion and sonoelectrochemistry (use of ultrasound in electrochemistry). This includes the development of new materials; storage of hydrogen and fuel cells; water treatment / disinfection; demonstrators and prototypes. Together with Torstein Dale Sjøtveit, he was member of the foundation group for the establishment of FREYR Battery (lithium-ion battery gigafactory) in Norway.

Pollet received his doctorate in physical chemistry with the dissertation "The Effect of Ultrasound on Electrochemical Processes" at the Sonochemistry Center of Excellence, School of Chemistry, Coventry University in England.

Prior to entering the French university system, he did his Terminale C (baccalaureat C) at the Lycée de Pontcharra (high school). In the final year of his Terminale C, he studied with the French researcher and infectiologist, specialist in HIV, hepatitis and Covid-19, Karine Lacombe.

Career
 Professor of Chemistry from August 2021 at the Institute for Hydrogen Research (IHR), Université du Québec à Trois-Rivières, Canada.
 Leader of H2CAN 2.0, a cluster of hydrogen R&D groups in Canada.
 INNERGEX Industrial Research Chair holder in Renewable Hydrogen Production from January 2022.
 NSERC Tier 1 Canada Research Chair holder in Green Hydrogen Production from August 2021.
 President of the Green Hydrogen Division of the International Association for Hydrogen Energy (IAHE) from September 2020.
 Visiting Professor of Chemistry from June 2020 to July 2021 at the Institute for Hydrogen Research (IHR), Université du Québec à Trois-Rivières, Canada.
 Visiting Professor of Hydrogen Energy from January 2019 to December 2021 at the South African Institute of Advanced Materials Chemistry, University of the Western Cape, South Africa.
 Leader of NTNU Energy Team Hydrogen from April 2019 to July 2021, Norway.
 Professor of renewable energy from May 2017 to July 2021 at the Department of Energy and Process Engineering, Norway.
 Visiting Professor since March 2013 at the Hydrogen Safety Engineering and Research Center, HySAFER, University of Ulster, UK.
 In 2018, he was a member of the founding group for the establishment of lithium-ion battery gigafactory, FREYR Battery, Norway. 
 In 2013, he was elected as member of the Board of Directors of the International Association for Hydrogen Energy.
 Visiting Professor at the Fuel Cell Nanomaterials Centre, University of Yamanashi, Japan from 2010 to 2016.
 In 2010, he was elected as Fellow of the Royal Society of Chemistry (RSC), UK.
 In 2008, he was part of a team of engineers, who made sure to put into operation the first hydrogen refueling station in England.
 In 2007, he helped with the second generation of hydrogen and fuel cell cars - Microcab

Publications 
 List of Bruno Pollet's publications in Google Scholar
 List of Bruno Pollet's publications in Scopus
 List of Bruno Pollet's publications in CRIStin

References

External links 
 "Justin Trudeau témoin de l’expertise de l’IRH", article in NEO UQTR, visited 21.01.23
 "A golden opportunity for Canada in hydrogen", article in The Hill Times 12.12.2022, visited 21.01.23
 "L’hydrogène essentiel dans le portefeuille énergétique, article and videos in Le Nouvelliste 25.10.2022, visited 22.01.2023
 "Bruno G. Pollet siégera au conseil d’administration de l’Association canadienne de l’hydrogène et des piles à combustible", article in entête 14.10.2022, visited 22.01.2023
 "Le professeur Bruno Pollet reçoit un prix prestigieux", article in Le Nouvelliste 06.07.2022, visited 15.07.2022
 "Un prof de l’UQTR sur un comité consultatif de l’ONU", article in Le Nouvelliste 14.06.2022, visited 25.06.2022
 "Vers une société de l’hydrogène québécoise?", article in Le Devoir 09.04.2022, visited 11.04.2022
 "Filière québécoise de l'hydrogène vert - Québec octroie 450 000 $ à l'UQTR pour développer la production d'hydrogène vert", interview in Newswire 17.03.22, visited 18.03.22
 "Québec investit dans un projet de recherche sur l’hydrogène vert à l’UQTR", article in ICI Mauricie-Centre-du-Québec Radio-Canada 17.03.2022, visited 22.05.2022
 "Grey versus green versus blue hydrogen", article in The Hill Times 07.03.2022, visited 22.05.2022
 "Améliorer la production d’hydrogène vert avec des ultrasons", article in L'Hebdo Journal 21.02.2022, visited 26.02.2022
 "Deux nouvelles chaires de recherche sur l’hydrogène et l’alimentation à l’UQTR", article in Le Nouvelliste 21.02.2022, visited 26.02.2022
 "Le Québec pourrait être un pôle mondial de l’hydrogène", article in Le Nouvelliste 13.11.2021, visited 26.02.2022
 "NTNU Team Hydrogen Leader, Bruno G. Pollet, Appointed President of Green Hydrogen Division", article in Fuel Cells Works, 15.09.2020, visited 26.02.2022
 "Hydrogen is one of the best fuels", interview in Asker and Bærums Budstikke, 11.06.2019, visited 24.09.2019
 "Sound can make hydrogen and fuel cells more efficient", article in Gemini 09.05.2018, visited 24.09.2019

21st-century French chemists
Scientists from Orléans
1969 births
Living people